Semler is an occupational surname derived from the occupation of baker who bakes semmels, i.e., white bread rolls.

Notable people with the surname include:

Andrée Sfeir-Semler (born 1953), art historian and gallery owner
Augustin Semler (born 1907), Romanian footballer
Borut Semler (born 1985), Slovene footballer
Dean Semler (born 1943), Australian cinematographer
Gustav Adolf Semler (1885–1968), German film actor of the silent era
Jack Semler, American ice hockey coach and former player
James "Soldier Boy" Semler, American sports executive, baseball team owner
Johann Salomo Semler (1725–1791), German church historian and Biblical commentator
Leonore Semler (1921–2016), German philanthropist
Ricardo Semler (born 1959), CEO and majority owner of the Brazilian company of Semco SA
Willy Semler (born 1959), Chilean actor

See also
Grace Semler Baldridge, who records music as Semler
Jules Semler-Collery (1902–1988), French composer, conductor and teacher
Selmer (disambiguation)
Semmler

References

German-language surnames
Yiddish-language surnames
Occupational surnames